Mark Philippoussis was the defending champion but lost in the first round to Jordi Burillo.

Scott Draper won in the final 7–6(7–5), 6–4 against Laurence Tieleman and became the lowest ranked player to win in the tournament's history.

Seeds
The top eight seeds received a bye to the second round.

 Pete Sampras (third round)
 Greg Rusedski (third round, retired)
 Patrick Rafter (second round)
 Jonas Björkman (third round)
 Karol Kučera (second round)
 Cédric Pioline (withdrew)
 Tim Henman (quarterfinals)
 Thomas Enqvist (quarterfinals)
 Mark Philippoussis (first round)
 Goran Ivanišević (second round)
 Todd Martin (first round)
 Todd Woodbridge (third round)
 Brett Steven (third round)
 Byron Black (semifinals)
 Mark Woodforde (semifinals)
 Jason Stoltenberg (first round)

Draw

Finals

Top half

Section 1

Section 2

Bottom half

Section 3

Section 4

External links 
 1998 Stella Artois Championships draw
 ITF tournament profile

Singles